Lucas Ramon Batista Silva (born 7 March 1994), known as Lucas Ramon, is a Brazilian footballer who plays as a right back for Mirassol.

The player has previously represented Londrina in Campeonato Brasileiro Série B, Campeonato Brasileiro Série C and Campeonato Brasileiro Série D and Grêmio in Campeonato Brasileiro Série A.

Career statistics

Honours
Londrina
Campeonato Paranaense: 2014
Primeira Liga: 2017

Santa Cruz
Campeonato Pernambucano: 2016
Copa do Nordeste: 2016

Red Bull Bragantino
Campeonato Brasileiro Série B: 2019

Cuiabá
Campeonato Mato-Grossense: 2021

References

External links
 

Living people
1994 births
Brazilian footballers
People from Montes Claros
Sportspeople from Minas Gerais
Association football defenders
Campeonato Brasileiro Série A players
Campeonato Brasileiro Série B players
Campeonato Brasileiro Série C players
Campeonato Brasileiro Série D players
Londrina Esporte Clube players
Grêmio Foot-Ball Porto Alegrense players
Santa Cruz Futebol Clube players
Grêmio Novorizontino players
Red Bull Bragantino players
Coritiba Foot Ball Club players
Cuiabá Esporte Clube players